Andrew John Scott may refer to:
 Andrew Scott (museum director), British museum director
 Andrew J Scott, British economist
 Andrew John Scott (botanist), British botanist
 Andrew Scott (Australian footballer), Australian rules footballer